Reads may refer to:
Reads, discount stores selling stationery, books and greetings cards, owned by Eason & Son
Reads, the third book in the Mothers and Daughters graphic novel by Dave Sim, and the tenth Cerebus the Aardvark volume 
The Reads, an English alternative rock band

See also
Read (disambiguation)